Momia Juanita (Spanish for "Mummy Juanita"), also known as the Lady of Ampato, is the well-preserved frozen body of a girl from the Inca Empire who was killed as a human sacrifice to the Inca gods sometime between 1440 and 1480, when she was approximately 12–15 years old. She was discovered on the dormant stratovolcano Mount Ampato (part of the Andes cordillera in southern Peru) in 1995 by anthropologist Johan Reinhard and his Peruvian climbing partner, Miguel Zárate. She is known as the Lady of Ampato because she was found on top of Mount Ampato. Her other nickname, the Ice Maiden, derives from the cold conditions and freezing temperatures that preserved her body on Mount Ampato.

Juanita has been on display in the Catholic University of Santa María's Museum of Andean Sanctuaries (Museo Santuarios Andinos) in Arequipa, Peru almost continuously since 1996, and was displayed on a tour in Japan in 1999.

In 1995, Time magazine chose her as one of the world's top ten discoveries. Between May and June 1996, she was exhibited in the headquarters of the National Geographic Society in Washington, D.C., in a specially acclimatized conservation display unit. In its June 1996 issue, National Geographic included an article dedicated to the discovery of Juanita.

Discovery
In September 1995, during an ascent of Mt. Ampato (20,700 ft, 6309 m), Johan Reinhard and Zárate found a bundle in the crater that had fallen from an Inca site on the summit due to recent ice melt and erosion from a volcano eruption. To their astonishment, the bundle turned out to contain the frozen body of a young girl. Juanita was found almost entirely frozen, which preserved her internal organs, hair, blood, skin, and contents of her stomach.

They also found many items that had been left as offerings to the Inca gods including llama bones, small figurines and pottery pieces. The items were strewn about the mountain slope, down which the body had fallen. These included statues, food items (maize kernels and cob), and spondylus shells, which originate from ocean ecosystems. These have been connected to rain ceremonies throughout the Incan Empire. The clothing she wore resembled textiles from the elite from Cuzco, the Inca capital. As Juanita is the closest discovered sacrifice to Cuzco and was found with textiles of the wealthy, archaeologists believe that this could suggest she came from a noble Cuzco family.

The body and the items were quickly transported to Arequipa to prevent thawing of the frozen specimen. The body was initially kept in a special refrigerator at the Catholic University.  Juanita's body was transported to the United States for a CT scan in 1996 and was then exhibited in Japan in 1999. She is considered one of the most well-preserved mummies in the Andes.

Two more ice mummies, a young girl and a boy, were discovered in an archaeological expedition led by Dr. Reinhard and Prof. José Antonio Chávez in October 1995, and they recovered another female mummy on Ampato in December 1997. Volcanic ash from the nearby erupting volcano of Sabancaya induced ice melt in the area, which caused the Incan burial sites to collapse down into a gully or crater where they were soon discovered by Reinhard and his team. Reinhard published a detailed account of the discovery in his 2006 book entitled, The Ice Maiden: Inca Mummies, Mountain Gods, and Sacred Sites in the Andes.

Scientific analysis

Body
As Reinhard and Zárate struggled on Ampato's summit to lift the heavy bundle containing Juanita's body, they realized that her body mass had probably been increased by freezing of the flesh. When initially weighed in Arequipa, the bundle containing "Juanita" weighed over 90 pounds (40.82 kilos). Their realization turned out to be correct; Juanita is almost entirely frozen, making her a substantial scientific find. Like only a few other high-altitude Inca mummies, Juanita was found frozen and thus her remains and garments were not desiccated like those of mummies found in other parts of the world. She was mummified by freezing conditions on the mountain top, instead of being artificially mummified, as is the case with Egyptian mummies. Her skin, organs, tissues, blood, hair, stomach contents, and garments are extremely well-preserved, offering scientists a rare glimpse into Inca culture during the reign of the Sapa Inca Pachacuti (reigned 1438–1471/1472).

Analysis of her stomach contents revealed that she ate a meal of vegetables six to eight hours before her death. Some evidence suggests that she may have come from a noble Cusco family. Stable isotopic analysis of other child sacrifices in the area has found changes in diet within the last year of life to indicate whether they originated from common families. This is usually indicated by the amount of meat protein consumed. Noble families would consume meat regularly whereas this may not have been the case for a non-noble family. Since there is no specific analysis of Juanita it is inconclusive if she came from a noble family or not. However, analysis of similar child sacrifices in the region all indicate that at six months before their death they were in Cusco, likely for a ceremony before making their journey to the mountains.

Adornments and grave goods 
Juanita was wrapped in a brightly coloured burial tapestry (or "aksu"). Her head was adorned with a cap made from the feathers of a red macaw, and she wore a lively woollen alpaca shawl fastened with a silver clasp. She was fully clothed in garments resembling the finest textiles from the Inca capital city of Cusco. These accoutrements were almost perfectly preserved, providing valuable insight into sacred Inca textiles and on how the Inca nobility dressed. Found with her in the burial tapestry was a collection of grave goods: bowls, pins, and figurines made of gold, silver, and shell.

Genetic analysis
According to the Institute for Genomic Research (TIGR), the closest kin they could find in the database in 1996 were the Ngobe people of Panama, but later research has shown her to share genetic patterns found in people from the Andes. Scientists at TIGR examined two mitochondrial DNA D loop sequences and found that Hypervariable region 1 (HV1) was consistent with mitochondrial haplogroup A2, one of the five Native American mitochondrial haplogroups. Hypervariable region 2 (HV2) included a unique sequence not found in any of the current mitochondrial DNA databases. Her haplotype is 16111T, 16223T, 16290T, 16319A.

Preparation for death 
Through extracting DNA from Mummy Juanita's well-preserved hair, scientists were able to determine her diet prior to the sacrifice. The analysis of her hair indicated that Juanita was eating foods such as animal protein and maize, which were the diet of the elite, unlike the standard Inca diet of vegetables.

The final six to eight weeks of life for a sacrificed Incan child consisted of heavy use of drugs and alcohol. With a combination of coca and chicha alcohol, the children would be in a highly intoxicated psychological state. Markers in Juanita's hair indicate that she was given coca and alcohol prior to her death, suggesting that she was in a state of near unconsciousness.

Cause of death
Radiologist Elliot K. Fishman concluded that she was killed by blunt trauma to the head. He observed that her cracked right eye socket and the  fracture in her skull are injuries "typical of someone who has been hit by a baseball bat." The blow caused a massive hemorrhage, filling her skull with blood and pushing her brain to one side. Death by trauma to the head was a common technique of sacrificing children in this era, along with strangulation and suffocation (burying alive).

Capacocha 
The ritual sacrifice called Capacocha (or Qhapaq hucha) was a key component to the Inca Empire. This ritual, which usually involved the sacrifice of children, was for celebratory events. These events included an annual or biennial event in the Incan calendar, the death of an emperor, the birth of a royal son, or a victory in battle, and were performed to prevent natural disasters such as volcanic eruptions, droughts, earthquakes, and epidemics. Beyond celebratory events and sacrifice for prevention, child sacrifice represented military and political expansion for the culture along with the empire's ability to use coercion and control.

As tribute payment, Inca rulers ordered boys and girls between the ages of 12 and 16 to sacrifice. Evidence of strontium analysis suggests that children were taken from several different geographical areas, brought to the Inca capital, and then potentially underwent months of travel to the sacred location at which they would be sacrificed. Archaeologists have discovered through biochemical analysis that coca (the primary source of cocaine) and alcohol were commonly found in the children's systems. Although archaeologists are unsure of why drugs and alcohol were used, some suggest that it was to put the chosen children in a stupor prior to death.

Connecting climate and culture 
Juanita was killed as a practice of capacocha, or child sacrifice, to appease Inca gods, or Apus. This practice often involves sacrificing a child at a huaca, or ceremonial shrine in a significant spiritual location, in this case Mt. Ampato. Children were selected as they were considered pure beings and worthy of giving to the Inca Gods. Once sacrificed, these children were believed to become messengers to the Apu(s) and act as negotiators for the people. The people in turn would worship the sacrificed children alongside worship of the gods. Ceremonial offerings happened annually, seasonally, or upon special occasions.

Juanita and several others were likely sacrificed to appease the gods after volcanic eruptions on the nearby Misti (1440-1450) and Sabancaya (1466) volcanos. Volcanic eruptions cause irregularities in climate that can last between 3–5 years depending on location and intensity. In these circumstances, precipitation patterns are altered due to particulate presence in the air. These periods are usually indicated by abnormal dryness or wetness. Overall, research has indicated that volcanic eruptions lead to a general trend of drought or less precipitation. Particulate from the explosions can also contaminate water supply and air quality. This is endorsed by Reinhard's observations and understandings from the field site: "the sacrifices were made either during a lengthy period of extreme drought, during (or just after) volcanic eruptions or both. Only in such periods could the ground have been unfrozen enough to allow the Incas to build the sites and bury the offerings as they did. And this factor could explain their importance. Droughts and volcanic ash would kill off pasturage and pollute and deplete the water sources so critical to the villagers below".

It is probable that Juanita was sacrificed in response to climatic irregularities to placate the gods in return for water. Incan belief at the time was that mountains (and their spirits) controlled weather and water and, thus, were intertwined with the villages below. The prosperity of the crops and people depended on the approval of the mountain deity to provide water for their consumption and irrigation. Water is a life-giving source and was perceived to be connected with femininity and fertility. Therefore, the mountains that provided water were attributed to be female deities by the Incas. In Southern Peru, it was believed that sacrificing a young female would appease the mountain deity who would in turn provide a consistent water supply to the region.

Others have suggested that child sacrifice could in part be used as a political strategy by Incan leaders to ensure control over the empire. Sacrifices during this time of empire expansion would infix a combination of respect and fear while further embedding devotion.

See also
Children of Llullaillaco
Chinchorro mummies
"Inca Mummy Girl"
List of unsolved murders
Ötzi the Iceman
Pazyryk Ice Maiden
Plomo Mummy

References

External links
Andes Expedition: Searching For Inca Secrets on National Geographic

15th-century births
15th-century deaths
15th-century indigenous people of the Americas
15th-century nobility
15th-century women
1995 archaeological discoveries
Archaeological discoveries in Peru
Archaeology of Peru
Deaths by beating
Human remains (archaeological)
Human sacrifice
Inca Empire people
Juanita
People from Arequipa Region